On 25 January 2023, a sexton was killed and four people, including a parish priest, were injured in a machete attack at two churches in Algeciras in the Spanish region of Andalusia. Police arrested Yassine Kanjaa, a 25-year-old Moroccan who had been living undocumented in Spain since 2019 and was under orders to leave. The attack is being treated as Islamic terrorism by the Audiencia Nacional.

Attack
According to the Ministry of the Interior, Kanjaa entered the San Isidro church at 19:00 and began trying to convert the congregation to Islam. He left and returned 20 minutes later with a machete, and began destroying Christian imagery. When the parish priest Antonio Rodríguez ordered him to leave, he stabbed him in the shoulder and neck. Rodríguez received surgery and his condition was described as stable.

Kanjaa then went to La Palma church, 200 metres away, and continued destroying Christian icons. When the sexton Diego Valencia ordered him to leave, he chased the official onto the Plaza Alta square by the city hall, where he stabbed and beat him to death. Three more 
people were wounded while trying to stop the violence.

Suspect
Kanjaa, an unmarried 25-year-old, lived in the villages of Belyounech and Oued El Marsa near Tangier. According to neighbours, he never had a steady job and was known for petty theft and hashish use. Neighbours said that Kanjaa's father had a mental illness, but had never held radical views; he was held in a psychiatric hospital on two occasions, though his diagnosis is unknown due to medical privacy. Kanjaa himself was monitored by mental health services in Morocco but was never sent to an institution.

In August 2019, Kanjaa crossed the Strait of Gibraltar illegally on a jetski, landing in Gibraltar. He was detained for three days and deported back to Morocco. He made his way over the strait again, landing in Spain, and lived in a squat in Algeciras with two other undocumented migrants. These flatmates described him as violent and unstable, as well as obsessed with religion. Unable to work, he lived off charity and did not socialise, not even with the city's Moroccan community. In June 2022, the National Police discovered his irregular status, and the Ministry of the Interior ordered his expulsion.

Two weeks before the church attacks, Kanjaa was involved in two disturbances at local mosques when he took issue with the officials. After finishing evening prayer at a mosque in La Marina, he became furious when it was being closed for the night, as he believed that mosques should never close their doors. He began shouting and pushing before being expelled. At a larger mosque on Calle Miguel Martín, he became furious when children began to run and shout upon leaving their classes at the madrasa and complained to the imam, who dismissed his complaints.

Minutes before the church attacks, Kanjaa launched an unprovoked beating on a 20-year-old Moroccan stranger whom he accused of "working for magic" and betraying Islam. The victim had his glasses broken and required stitches.

Investigations on Kanjaa's mobile phone found that he was in contact with jihadists in Tangier and Ceuta.

Reactions
The attack was condemned by leading politicians including prime minister of Spain Pedro Sánchez, leader of the opposition Alberto Núñez Feijóo, and President of the Regional Government of Andalusia Juanma Moreno. Vox politicians made statements against illegal immigration, with leader Santiago Abascal writing that "Islamism is already on our land because some open the gates to them, others finance them and we Spaniards suffer the consequences"; these statements were condemned as exploitative by other parties including the People's Party. The attack was condemned by local Moroccans and Muslims.

Diego Valencia's funeral was held at his church on 27 January, with mourners including Juanma Moreno, mayor José Ignacio Landaluce and Bishop of Cádiz and Ceuta Rafael Zornoza. Zornoza said "He died for his faith and proclaiming his faith. The Lord will take him in his glory".

See also
 2023 in Spain
 Terrorism in Spain

References

church
Mass stabbings in Europe
Attacks in Europe in 2023
Stabbing attacks in 2023
January 2023 events in Spain
January 2023 crimes in Europe
Attacks on churches in Europe
Islamist attacks on churches